Fiador can refer to:
Fiador (tack)
Fiador knot